Three Sisters is a 2010 South Korean television series starring Myung Se-bin, Yang Mi-ra, Jo An, Song Jong-ho, Shim Hyung-tak, and Kim Young-jae. The daily drama is about the lives of two generations of three sisters, portraying their relationships and the difficulties they face. It aired on SBS on Mondays to Fridays at 19:15 from April 19 to October 27, 2010, for 123 episodes.

Plot
39-year-old Kim Eun-young (Myung Se-bin) is the eldest among the younger generation of sisters. She has a thoughtful personality and was good in school, but to help her family she didn't attend college. Eun-young gets hurt when her husband Choi Young-ho (Kim Young-jae) has an affair, and contemplates divorce.

33-year-old Kim Eun-shil (Yang Mi-ra) is the middle sister of the younger generation of sisters. She is a divorcee and her daughter Yoon Goo-seul (Ahn Seo-hyun) lives with her ex-husband. Her character is somewhat vain, enjoying expensive items like designer clothes and bags.

29-year-old Kim Eun-joo (Jo An) is the youngest sister of the younger generation of sisters. Although she is a widow, she lives a bright life.

65-year-old Jang Jang-ae (Jung Jae-soon) is the eldest among the older generation of sisters. After her parents died, Jang-ae quit school to raise her two younger sisters. She never married and has no children.

61-year-old Jang Soon-ae (Park Won-sook) has a very considerate personality. She is the middle sister of the older generation of sisters, and the mother of the three sisters of the younger generation. She is married to Kim Won-tae (Jang Yong), and her husband runs a restaurant with her older sister Jang-ae. Soon-ae also has a son, Kim Eun-gook (Lee Je-hoon), who is adopted.

49-year-old Jang Ji-ae (Kyeon Mi-ri) is the youngest of the older generation of sisters. After the death of her parents soon after her birth, Ji-ae was raised by her oldest sister Jang-ae. With Jang-ae's support, Ji-ae was able to attend college. But she fell in love, dropped out, married her college sweetheart, then got divorced. She later lost her fortune to a younger man. Ji-ae has a romantic personality and now lives with Jang-ae.

Cast
Kim family
Myung Se-bin as Kim Eun-young (eldest sister)
Yang Mi-ra as Kim Eun-shil (middle sister)
Jo An as Kim Eun-joo (youngest sister)
Jang Yong as Kim Won-tae (father)
Park Won-sook as Jang Soon-ae (mother)
Lee Je-hoon as Kim Eun-gook (brother)

Jang family
Jung Jae-soon as Jang Jang-ae (Soon-ae's older sister)
Kyeon Mi-ri as Jang Ji-ae (Soon-ae's younger sister)

Lee family
Song Jong-ho as Lee Min-woo
Hyun Woo-sung as Lee Min-chul (brother)
Park Jung-soo as Park Young-ok (mother)

Go family
Shin Soo-jung as Go Ji-young
Ahn Gil-ho as Go Tae-young (brother)
Park Joon-geum as Shin Sook-ja (mother)
Kim Jin-woo  as Go Se-jong (Eun-joo's son)

Choi family
Kim Young-jae as Choi Young-ho
Seo Ji-hee as Choi Bo-ram (Eun-young and Young-ho's daughter)
Choi Eun-sook as Young-ho's mother
Nam Hyun-joo as Young-ho's sister-in-law
Lee Dae-ro as Young-ho's father (cameo)

Extended cast
Shim Hyung-tak as Park Woo-chan
Ahn Seo-hyun as Yoon Goo-seul (Eun-shil's daughter)
Im Ji-eun as Kang Mi-ran
Shin Ji-soo as Park Jin-sook
Kim Hae-in as Kyung-ah (intern doctor)
Go Se-won as Park Sang-tae
Kim Byung-se as Jae-suk
Jung Dong-hwan as Kim Won-bin
Seo Kwon-soon as Jae-suk's mother
Kang Sung-jin as Gun-dal (cameo)
Kim Young-ran as matchmaker Madam Tu (cameo)
Han Da-min as Song Tae-hee (cameo)

Awards
2010 SBS Drama Awards: Best Supporting Actress in a Weekend/Daily Drama - Im Ji-eun

References

External links
Three Sisters official SBS website 

Seoul Broadcasting System television dramas
2010 South Korean television series debuts
2010 South Korean television series endings
Korean-language television shows